The  Eastern League season began on approximately April 1 and the regular season ended on approximately September 1. 

The Harrisburg Senators defeated the Norwich Navigators 3 games to 2 to win the Eastern League Championship Series.

Regular season

Standings

Notes:
Green shade indicates that team advanced to the playoffs.
Bold indicates that team advanced to ELCS.
Italics indicates that team won ELCS.

Statistical league leaders

Batting leaders

Pitching leaders

Playoffs

Divisional Series

Northern Division
The Norwich Navigators defeated the Trenton Thunder in the Northern Division playoffs 3 games to 2.

Southern Division
The Harrisburg Senators defeated the Erie SeaWolves in the Southern Division playoffs 3 games to 1.

Championship Series
The Harrisburg Senators defeated the Norwich Navigators in the ELCS 3 games to 2. In the final game of the series, the Navigators were leading 11-9 in the bottom of the ninth. The bases were loaded, there was 2 outs and a full count. That's when Milton Bradley hit a grand slam to win the game, and league championship, for the Senators.

References

External links
1999 Eastern League Review at thebaseballcube.com

Eastern League seasons